Roe is an electoral district of the Legislative Assembly of Western Australia. It takes in rural areas in the south of the state. Roe was re-created for the 2017 state election, having previously been in existence from 1950 to 1983 and from 1989 to 2008. It had a notional 16.7-point majority for the National Party against the Liberal Party, based on the results of the 2013 state election.

Geography

In its current incarnation, Roe includes portions of four regions of Western Australia – the South West, the Wheatbelt, the Great Southern and Goldfields-Esperance. There are eighteen local government areas that fall into the district: Broomehill-Tambellup, Cranbrook, Cuballing, Dumbleyung, Esperance, Gnowangerup, Katanning, Kent, Kojonup, Kulin, Lake Grace, Narrogin, Ravensthorpe, Wagin, West Arthur, Wickepin, Williams and Woodanilling.

History
Roe was first created in 1950 and abolished in 1983. It was recreated in 1989. In both of its previous incarnations, it was a staunchly conservative seat that traded hands between the Liberal Party and what became the National Party. Indeed, in its second incarnation, Labor was frequently pushed into third place.

Roe was abolished ahead of the 2008 state election as a result of the reduction in rural seats made necessary by the one vote one value reforms. At its abolition in 2008, Roe was a southern coastal electorate that included the towns of Esperance, Gnowangerup, Kulin, Lake Grace, Bremer Bay and Ravensthorpe. Its former territory was split between the new district of Eyre and the enlarged district of Wagin. Following Roe's abolition, sitting Liberal MP Graham Jacobs contested and won the seat of Eyre.

Roe was re-created in a redistribution prior to the 2017 state election, taking in areas of two abolished seats, Eyre and Wagin. The former member for Eyre, Jacobs, attempted to transfer here, but was roundly defeated by the Nationals' Peter Rundle.

Members for Roe

Election results

References

External links
 
 WAEC district maps: current boundaries, previous distributions

Roe
1950 establishments in Australia
Constituencies established in 1950